Okoumé may refer to:
 Okoumé, a Quebec band active from 1995-2002
 Okoumé, an alternate name for Aucoumea klaineana, an African hardwood